The Old County Courthouse (also known as the Plymouth Old County Courthouse or the Old Town House) is an historic court house on Leyden Street and Market Street in the Town Square of Plymouth, Massachusetts. Built in 1749, the two-story wood-frame building is believed to be the oldest wooden courthouse in the United States; it stands on the site of the first courthouse built by Plymouth Colony settlers, and may incorporate elements of a 1670 building. The site was originally the site of Edward Winslow's first house in Plymouth.

It is five bays wide and three deep, with a center entry flanked by sidelight windows and pilasters, and topped by a gabled pediment. It was built by Peter Oliver, and initially served as both a courthouse and as town offices.  It was converted to solely municipal use in 1821, and had a myriad of municipal functions since then.  In the 1970s it was converted into a museum.

The building was added to the National Register of Historic Places in 1972.  It is now known as the 1749 Court House and Museum, and is open from June to September with exhibits of early Plymouth history.

Gallery

See also
Oldest courthouses in the United States
National Register of Historic Places listings in Plymouth County, Massachusetts

References

External links
1749 Court House and Museum

Government buildings completed in 1749
Courthouses on the National Register of Historic Places in Massachusetts
Museums in Plymouth, Massachusetts
History museums in Massachusetts
Law museums in the United States
County courthouses in Massachusetts
National Register of Historic Places in Plymouth County, Massachusetts